Über is a comic book series written by British author Kieron Gillen and illustrated by Caanan White, Gabriel Andrade and Daniel Gete. It is published monthly by Avatar Press, which released the first issue in April 2013. The comic depicts an alternate World War II in which the Third Reich develops powerful superhuman soldiers in 1945, preventing its imminent defeat and forcing the Allied nations to counter with superhumans of their own. The series is notable for its extreme violence, its depiction of wartime moral ambiguity, and the major roles it gives to historical figures such as Adolf Hitler, Winston Churchill, Alan Turing and Heinz Guderian. The complete series of Über is scheduled to comprise up to 60 issues.

Publication history
Gillen began conducting background research for Über in 2008, eventually compiling a 30,000-word "bible" of historical research to support the project. The first issue of the series, Über #0, was published by Avatar in April 2013; the series is ultimately scheduled to run up to 60 issues. A spin-off title exploring the backstories of several major characters, Über Special #1, was published in March 2014. A free recap issue, entitled Über: The First Cycle, was published for Free Comic Book Day in May 2014. Gillen announced that the series will finish with issue 21 of the Invasion series. After issue 17 of Uber Invasion the series has been on hiatus. As of February 2022, Gillen has continually expressed a desire to publish the remaining 4 issues but clarified in a blog post that plans have not materialized yet.

Plot summary
The plot of Über begins in April 1945, as Adolf Hitler's Third Reich faces total defeat at the hands of the Soviet Union. Hitler's suicide attempt in the Führerbunker is interrupted by the news that a secret military research project has succeeded in creating Übermenschen ("Übers") – enhanced humans with extreme strength and durability, combined with the ability to generate a destructive energy field known as a "disruption halo". These Nazi superhumans are divided into two classes – the basic "tank" class ("Panzermensch"), who number several hundred at the start of the series, and the "battleship" class, who are far more powerful but number only three. The German "battleships" – two male and a female – are code-named Siegmund, Siegfried, and Sieglinde, after characters in Richard Wagner's Ring cycle. The Übers quickly turn the tide of the war in Germany, saving Berlin from the advancing Soviets.

As the Nazis attempt to rebuild their ruined country and strike out at the Allies, an Allied spy delivers the technology for creating superhumans to the British. It is revealed that only one human in 5,000 is viable for enhancement, with an even smaller number potentially capable of becoming "battleships". Meanwhile, in the Pacific theater, the United States Navy suffers a series of disastrous defeats at the hands of Imperial Japanese superhumans. Soon, all the major powers are embroiled in an arms race to develop more and stronger Übers, leading to new war atrocities, including the mass extermination of prisoners of war and convict soldiers by both the Nazis and Soviets. As the war escalates, the enhanced humans themselves face the dehumanizing prospect of becoming pure living weapons.

Reception
Über received favorable reviews upon its initial release, and its first issue rapidly sold out. However, its author was accused by some critics of glorifying Nazism and white supremacism; both Gillen and the series' African-American lead artist Caanan White strongly denied that this was the case.

Reviewing the first collected volume of Über in 2014, Kieron Moore of Starburst wrote that "It’s not easy reading but dark and clever stuff – you won’t laugh, you probably won’t cry, but it might make you think. It’s a world where war is horrific and people in power make horrible decisions. A worryingly real world." Emily King of Hex Dimension remarked that the comic "gives the delicious feeling that everything will go to hell for everyone involved, regardless of the side they’re on: the unpredictability of the plot makes Über really stand out." Shadowgum.co.uk described Über as "a black joke at the expense of how we have romanticised World War II...[showcasing] robust scripts from Gillen that lay the groundwork for what may turn out to be a rich epic of dark fantasy."

References

Comics about World War II alternate histories